The class Mammalia (mammals) is divided into two subclasses based on reproductive techniques: egg-laying mammals (yinotherians or monotremes - see also Australosphenida), and mammals which give live birth (therians).  The latter subclass is divided into two infraclasses: pouched mammals (metatherians or marsupials), and placental mammals (eutherians, for which see List of placental mammals). Classification updated from Wilson and Reeder's "Mammal Species of the World: A Taxonomic and Geographic Reference" using the "Planet Mammifères" website.

Subclass Prototheria (the monotremes)

Order Monotremata (monotremes, egg-laying mammals)

Family Ornithorhynchidae (platypus)
Genus Ornithorhynchus (platypus)
Platypus (Ornithorhynchus anatinus)
Family Tachyglossidae (echidnas)
 Genus Tachyglossus (short-beaked echidna)
Short-beaked echidna (Tachyglossus aculeatus)
 Genus Zaglossus (long-beaked echidnas)
Western long-beaked echidna (Zaglossus bruijnii)
Eastern long-beaked echidna (Zaglossus bartoni)
Sir David's long-beaked echidna (Zaglossus attenboroughi)

Subclass Theria

Infraclass Metatheria (marsupials)

Order Didelphimorphia (American opossums)

 Family Didelphidae (opossums)
 Subfamily Caluromyinae
 Genus Caluromysiops
 Black-shouldered opossum (Caluromysiops irrupta)
 Genus Caluromys (woolly opossum)
 Subgenus Caluromys
 Bare-tailed woolly opossum (Caluromys philander)
 Subgenus Mallodelphys
 Derby's woolly opossum (Caluromys derbianus)
 Brown-eared woolly opossum (Caluromys lanatus)
 Subfamily Glironiinae
 Genus Glironia
 Bushy-tailed opossum (Glironia venusta)
 Subfamily Hyladelphinae
 Genus Hyladelphys
 Kalinowski's mouse opossum (Hyladelphys kalinowskii)
 Subfamily Didelphinae
 Tribe Metachirini
 Genus Metachirus
 Brown four-eyed opossum (Metachirus myosuros)
 Tribe Didelphini
 Genus Chironectes
 Yapok or water opossum (Chironectes minimus)
 Genus Lutreolina
 Massoia's lutrine opossum (Lutreolina massoia)
 Big lutrine opossum or thick-tailed opossum (Lutreolina crassicaudata)
 Genus Philander (gray and black four-eyed opossum)
 Anderson's four-eyed opossum (Philander andersoni)
 Deltaic four-eyed opossum (Philander deltae)
 Southeastern four-eyed opossum (Philander frenatus)
 McIlhenny's four-eyed opossum (Philander mcilhennyi)
 Mondolfi's four-eyed opossum (Philander mondolfii)
 Olrog's four-eyed opossum (Philander olrogi)
 Gray four-eyed opossum (Philander opossum)
 Genus Didelphis
 White-eared opossum (Didelphis albiventris)
 Big-eared opossum (Didelphis aurita)
 Guianan white-eared opossum (Didelphis imperfecta)
 Common opossum (Didelphis marsupialis)
 Andean white-eared opossum (Didelphis pernigra)
 Virginia opossum (Didelphis virginiana)
 Tribe Thylamyini
 Genus Chacodelphys
 Chacoan pygmy opossum (Chacodelphys formosa)
 Genus Cryptonanus
 Agricola's gracile opossum (Cryptonanus agricolai)
 Chacoan gracile opossum (Cryptonanus chacoensis)
 Guahiba gracile opossum (Cryptonanus guahybae)
 †Red-bellied gracile opossum (Cryptonanus ignitus)
 Unduavi gracile opossum (Cryptonanus unduaviensis)
 Genus Gracilinanus
 Aceramarca gracile opossum (Gracilinanus aceramarcae)
 Agile gracile opossum (Gracilinanus agilis)
 Wood sprite gracile opossum (Gracilinanus dryas)
 Emilia's gracile opossum (Gracilinanus emilae)
 Northern gracile opossum (Gracilinanus marica)
 Brazilian gracile opossum (Gracilinanus microtarsus)
 Genus Lestodelphys
 Patagonian opossum (Lestodelphys halli)
 Genus Marmosops (slender opossum)
 Bishop's slender opossum (Marmosops bishopi)
 Narrow-headed slender opossum (Marmosops cracens)
 Creighton's slender opossum (Marmosops creightoni)
 Dorothy's slender opossum (Marmosops dorothea)
 Dusky slender opossum (Marmosops fuscatus)
 Handley's slender opossum (Marmosops handleyi)
 Tschudi's slender opossum (Marmosops impavidus)
 Gray slender opossum (Marmosops incanus)
 Panama slender opossum (Marmosops invictus)
 Junin slender opossum (Marmosops juninensis)
 Neblina slender opossum (Marmosops neblina)
 White-bellied slender opossum (Marmosops noctivagus)
 Little spotted slender opossum (Marmosops ocellatus)
 Delicate slender opossum (Marmosops parvidens)
 Brazilian slender opossum (Marmosops paulensis)
 Pinheiro's slender opossum (Marmosops pinheiroi)
 Genus Thylamys (fat-tailed mouse opossum)
 Cinderella fat-tailed mouse opossum (Thylamys cinderella)
 Elegant fat-tailed mouse opossum (Thylamys elegans)
 Karimi's fat-tailed mouse opossum (Thylamys karimii)
 Paraguayan fat-tailed mouse opossum (Thylamys macrurus)
 White-bellied fat-tailed mouse opossum (Thylamys pallidior)
 Common fat-tailed mouse opossum (Thylamys pusillus)
 Argentine fat-tailed mouse opossum (Thylamys sponsorius)
 Tate's fat-tailed mouse opossum (Thylamys tatei)
 Dwarf fat-tailed mouse opossum (Thylamys velutinus)
 Buff-bellied fat-tailed mouse opossum (Thylamys venustus)
 Tribe Marmosini
 Genus Tlacuatzin
 Gray mouse opossum (Tlacuatzin canescens)
 Genus Marmosa (mouse opossum)
 Subgenus Stegomarmosa
 Heavy-browed mouse opossum (Marmosa andersoni)
 Subgenus Marmosa
 Isthmian mouse opossum (Marmosa isthmica)
 Rufous mouse opossum (Marmosa lepida)
 Mexican mouse opossum (Marmosa mexicana)
 Linnaeus's mouse opossum (Marmosa murina)
 Quechuan mouse opossum (Marmosa quichua)
 Robinson's mouse opossum (Marmosa robinsoni)
 Red mouse opossum (Marmosa rubra)
 Tyler's mouse opossum (Marmosa tyleriana)
 Guajira mouse opossum (Marmosa xerophila)
 Subgenus Micoureus
 Alston's mouse opossum (Marmosa alstoni)
 White-bellied woolly mouse opossum (Marmosa constantiae)
 Tate's woolly mouse opossum (Marmosa paraguayanus)
 Little woolly mouse opossum (Marmosa phaeus)
 Woolly mouse opossum (Marmosa demerarae)
 Bare-tailed woolly mouse opossum (Marmosa regina)
 Genus Monodelphis (short-tailed opossum)
 Subgenus Minuania
 Ronald's opossum (Monodelphis ronaldi)
 Chestnut-striped opossum (Monodelphis rubida)
 Reig's opossum (Monodelphis reigi)
 Long-nosed short-tailed opossum (Monodelphis scalops)
 Yellow-sided opossum (Monodelphis dimidiata)
 Red three-striped opossum (Monodelphis umbristriata)
 Subgenus Monodelphis
 Sepia short-tailed opossum (Monodelphis adusta)
 Amazonas short-tailed opossum (Monodelphis amazonica)
 Northern three-striped opossum (Monodelphis americana)
 Arlindo's opossum (Monodelphis arlindoi)
 Northern red-sided opossum (Monodelphis brevicaudata)
 Gray short-tailed opossum (Monodelphis domestica)
 Emilia's short-tailed opossum (Monodelphis emiliae)
 Gardner's short-tailed opossum (Monodelphis gardneri)
 Amazonian red-sided opossum (Monodelphis glirina)
 Handley's short-tailed opossum (Monodelphis handleyi)
 Ihering's three-striped opossum (Monodelphis iheringi)
 Pygmy short-tailed opossum (Monodelphis kunsi)
 (Monodelphis macae)
 Marajó short-tailed opossum (Monodelphis maraxina)
 Obscure short-tailed opossum (Monodelphis obscura)
 Osgood's short-tailed opossum (Monodelphis osgoodi)
 Hooded red-sided opossum (Monodelphis palliolata)
 (Monodelphis pinocchio)
 Santa Rosa opossum (Monodelphis sanctaerosae)
 Southern red-sided opossum (Monodelphis sorex)
 Southern three-striped opossum (Monodelphis theresa)
 One-striped opossum (Monodelphis unistriata)

Order Paucituberculata
Family Caenolestidae (shrew opossum)
 Genus Lestoros
 Incan caenolestid, (Lestoros inca)
 Genus Rhyncholestes
 Long-nosed caenolestid, (Rhyncholestes raphanurus)
 Genus Caenolestes
 Gray-bellied caenolestid, (Caenolestes caniventer)
 Andean caenolestid, (Caenolestes condorensis)
 Northern caenolestid, (Caenolestes convelatus)
 Dusky caenolestid, (Caenolestes fuliginosus)

Order Microbiotheria (monito del monte)
Family Microbiotheriidae
Genus Dromiciops
Monito del monte (Dromiciops gliroides)

Order Notoryctemorphia (marsupial moles)
Family Notoryctidae
Genus Notoryctes
Northern marsupial mole (Notoryctes caurinus)
Southern marsupial mole (Notoryctes typhlops)

Order Dasyuromorphia (marsupial carnivores)

Family †Thylacinidae
Genus †Thylacinus
†Thylacine (Thylacinus cynocephalus) 
Family Myrmecobiidae
Genus Myrmecobius
Numbat (Myremecobius fasciatus)
 Family Dasyuridae
 Subfamily Dasyurinae
 Tribe Dasyurini
 Genus Dasycercus (mulgaras)
 Crest-tailed mulgara, (Dasycercus cristicauda)
 Genus Dasykaluta
 Little red kaluta, (Dasykalua rosamondae)
 Genus Dasyuroides
 Kowari, (Dasyuroides byrnei)
 Genus Dasyurus (quolls)
 Subgenus Satanellus
 Northern quoll, (Dasyurus hallucatus)
 Subgenus Dasyurops
 Tiger quoll, (Dasyurus maculatus)
 Subgenus Dasyurinus
 Western quoll, (Dasyurus geoffroii)
 Subgenus Dasyurus
 New Guinean quoll, (Dasyurus albopunctatus)
 Bronze quoll, (Dasyurus spartacus)
 Eastern quoll, (Dasyurus viverrinus)
 Genus Myoictis
 Woolley's three-striped dasyure (Myoictis leucera)
 Three-striped dasyure, (Myoictis melas)
 Wallace's dasyure, (Myoictis wallacii)
 Tate's three-striped dasyure (Myoictis wavicus)
 Genus Neophascogale
 Speckled dasyure, (Neophascogale lorentzi)
 Genus Parantechinus
 Dibbler, (Parantechinus apicalis)
 Genus Phascolosorex
 Red-bellied marsupial shrew, (Phascolosorex doriae)
 Narrow-striped marsupial shrew, (Phascolosorex dorsalis)
 Genus Pseudantechinus
 Sandstone dibbler, (Pseudantechinus bilarni)
 Fat-tailed false antechinus, (Pseudantechinus macdonnellensis)
 Alexandria false antechinus, (Pseudantechinus mimulus)
 Ningbing false antechinus, (Pseudantechinus ningbing)
 Rory Cooper's false antechinus, (Pseudantechinus roryi)
 Woolley's false antechinus, (Pseudantechinus woolleyae)
 Genus Sarcophilus
 Tasmanian devil, (Sarcophilus harrisii)
 Tribe Phascogalini
 Genus Antechinus
 Tropical antechinus, (Antechinus adustus)
 Agile antechinus, (Antechinus agilis)
 Silver-headed antechinus, (Antechinus argentus)
 Black-tailed antechinus, (Antechinus arktos)
 Fawn antechinus, (Antechinus bellus)
 Yellow-footed antechinus, (Antechinus flaviceps)
 Atherton antechinus, (Antechinus godmani)
 Cinnamon antechinus, (Antechinus leo)
 Swamp antechinus, (Antechinus minimus)
 Buff-footed antechinus, (Antechinus mysticus)
 Brown antechinus, (Antechinus stuartii)
 Subtropical antechinus, (Antechinus subtropicus)
 Dusky antechinus, (Antechinus swainsonii)
 Tasman Peninsula Dusky antechinus, (Antechinus vandycki)
 Genus Murexia
 Subgenus Micromurexia
 Habbema dasyure, (Murexia habbema)
 Subgenus Murexechinus
 Lesser antechinus, (Murexia wilhelmina)
 Black-tailed dasyure, (Murexia melanurus)
 Subgenus Murexia
 Short-furred dasyure, (Murexia longicaudata)
 Subgenus Paramurexia
 Broad-striped dasyure, (Murexia rothschildi)
 Subgenus Phascomurexia
 Long-nosed dasyure, (Murexia naso)
 Genus Phascogale
 Red-tailed phascogale, (Phascogale calura)
 Brush-tailed phascogale, (Phascogale tapoatafa)
 Subfamily Sminthopsinae
 Genus Sminthopsis
 Subgenus Antechinomys
 Kultarr, (Antechinomys laniger)
 Subgenus Ningaui
 Wongai ningaui, (Ningaui ridei)
 Pilbara ningaui, (Ningaui timealeyi)
 Southern ningaui, (Ningaui yvonneae)
 Subgenus Sminthopsis
 S. crassicaudata species-group
 Fat-tailed dunnart, (Sminthopsis crassicaudata)
 S. macroura species-group
 Kakadu dunnart, (Sminthopsis bindi)
 Carpentarian dunnart, (Sminthopsis butleri)
 Julia Creek dunnart, (Sminthopsis douglasi)
 Stripe-faced dunnart, (Sminthopsis macroura)
 Red-cheeked dunnart, (Sminthopsis virginiae)
 S. granulipes species-group
 White-tailed dunnart, (Sminthopsis granulipes)
 S. griseoventer species-group
 Kangaroo Island dunnart, (Sminthopsis aitkeni)
 Boullanger Island dunnart, (Sminthopsis boullangerensis)
 Grey-bellied dunnart, (Sminthopsis griseoventer)
 S. longicaudata species-group
 Long-tailed dunnart, (Sminthopsis longicaudata)
 S. murina species-group
 Chestnut dunnart, (Sminthopsis archeri)
 Little long-tailed dunnart, (Sminthopsis dolichura)
 Sooty dunnart, (Sminthopsis fuliginosus)
 Gilbert's dunnart, (Sminthopsis gilberti)
 White-footed dunnart, (Sminthopsis leucopus)
 Slender-tailed dunnart, (Sminthopsis murina)
 S. psammophila species-group
 Hairy-footed dunnart, (Sminthopsis hirtipes)
 Ooldea dunnart, (Sminthopsis ooldea)
 Sandhill dunnart, (Sminthopsis psammophila)
 Lesser hairy-footed dunnart, (Sminthopsis youngsoni)
 Genus Planigale
 Paucident planigale, (Planigale gilesi)
 Long-tailed planigale, (Planigale ingrami)
 Common planigale, (Planigale maculata)
 New Guinean planigale, (Planigale novaeguineae)
 Narrow-nosed planigale, (Planigale tenuirostris)

Order Peramelemorphia (bandicoots and bilbies)

Family Thylacomyidae
Genus Macrotis (bilbies)
Greater bilby (Macrotis lagotis)
†Lesser bilby (Macrotis leucura) 
 Family Peramelidae
 Genus Isoodon: short-nosed bandicoots
 Golden bandicoot, (Isoodon auratus)
 Northern brown bandicoot, (Isoodon macrourus)
 Southern brown bandicoot, (Isoodon obesulus)
 Genus Perameles: long-nosed bandicoots
 Western barred bandicoot, (Perameles bougainville)
 Eastern barred bandicoot, (Perameles gunnii)
 Long-nosed bandicoot, (Perameles nasuta)
 †Desert bandicoot, (Perameles eremiana)
Family †Chaeropodidae
Genus †Chaeropus (pig-footed bandicoots)
†Southern pig-footed bandicoot (Chaeropus ecaudatus) 
†Northern pig-footed bandicoot (Chaeropus yirratji) 
 Family Peroryctidae (New Guinean bandicoots)
 Subfamily Peroryctinae
 Genus Peroryctes: New Guinean long-nosed bandicoots
 Giant bandicoot, (Peroryctes broadbenti)
 Raffray's bandicoot, (Peroryctes raffrayana)
 Subfamily Echymiperinae
 Genus Echymipera: New Guinean spiny bandicoots
 Long-nosed spiny bandicoot, (Echymipera rufescens)
 Clara's spiny bandicoot, (Echymipera clara)
 Menzies' spiny bandicoot, (Echymipera echinista)
 Common spiny bandicoot, (Echymipera kalubu)
 David's spiny bandicoot, (Echymipera davidi)
 Genus Microperoryctes : New Guinean mouse bandicoots
 Papuan bandicoot, (Microperoryctes papuensis)
 Subgenus Microperoryctes
 Mouse bandicoot, (Microperoryctes murina)
 Subgenus Ornoryctes
 Eastern striped bandicoot, (Microperoryctes ornata)
 Western striped bandicoot, (Microperoryctes longicauda)
 Arfak pygmy bandicoot, (Microperoryctes aplini)
 Genus Rhynchomeles
 Seram bandicoot, (Rhynchomeles prattorum)

Order Diprotodontia (diprotodont marsupials)

Suborder Vombatiformes (wombats and koalas)
Family Phascolarctidae (koala)
Genus Phascolarctos
Koala (Phascolarctos cinereus)
Family Vombatidae (wombats)
 Genus Lasiorhinus (hairy-nosed wombats)
Northern hairy-nosed wombat (Lasiorhinus krefftii)
Southern hairy-nosed wombat (Lasiorhinus latifrons)
 Genus Vombatus (naked-nosed wombat)
Common wombat (Vombatus ursinus)

Suborder Phalangeriformes (possums and gliders)
 Superfamily Phalangeroidea
 Family Burramyidae: pygmy possums
 Genus Burramys
 Mountain pygmy possum (Burramys parvus)
 Genus Cercartetus
 Long-tailed pygmy possum (Cercartetus caudatus)
 Southwestern pygmy possum (Cercartetus concinnus)
 Tasmanian pygmy possum (Cercartetus lepidus)
 Eastern pygmy possum (Cercartetus nanus)
 Family Phalangeridae: brushtail possums and cuscuses
 Subfamily Trichosurinae
 Genus Trichosurus
 Northern brushtail possum (Trichosurus arnhemensis)
 Short-eared possum (Trichosurus caninus)
 Mountain brushtail possum (Trichosurus cunninghami)
 Coppery brushtail possum (Trichosurus johnstonii)
 Common brushtail possum (Trichosurus vulpecula)
 Genus Wyulda
 Scaly-tailed possum (Wyulda squamicaudata)
 Subfamily Ailuropinae
 Genus Ailurops
 Talaud bear cuscus (Ailurops melanotis)
 Sulawesi bear cuscus (Ailurops ursinus)
 Genus Strigocuscus
 Sulawesi dwarf cuscus (Strigocuscus celebensis)
 Banggai cuscus (Strigocuscus pelegensis)
 Subfamily Phalangerinae
 Genus Phalanger
 Gebe cuscus (Phalanger alexandrae)
 Mountain cuscus (Phalanger carmelitae)
 Ground cuscus (Phalanger gymnotis)
 Eastern common cuscus (Phalanger intercastellanus)
 Woodlark cuscus (Phalanger lullulae)
 Blue-eyed cuscus (Phalanger matabiru)
 Telefomin cuscus (Phalanger matanim)
 Southern common cuscus (Phalanger mimicus)
 Northern common cuscus (Phalanger orientalis)
 Ornate cuscus (Phalanger ornatus)
 Rothschild's cuscus (Phalanger rothschildi)
 Silky cuscus (Phalanger sericeus)
 Stein's cuscus (Phalanger vestitus)
 Genus Spilocuscus
 Admiralty Island cuscus (Spilocuscus kraemeri)
 Common spotted cuscus (Spilocuscus maculatus)
 Waigeou cuscus (Spilocuscus papuensis)
 Black-spotted cuscus (Spilocuscus rufoniger)
 Blue-eyed spotted cuscus (Spilocuscus wilsoni)
 Superfamily Petauroidea
 Family Pseudocheiridae
 Subfamily Hemibelideinae
 Genus Hemibelideus
 Lemur-like ringtail possum (Hemibelideus lemuroides)
 Genus Petauroides
 †Ayamaru greater glider (Petauroides ayamaruensis)
 Southern greater glider (Petauroides volans)
 Northern greater glider (Petauroides minor)
 Central greater glider (Petauroides armillatus)
 Subfamily Pseudocheirinae
 Genus Petropseudes
 Rock-haunting ringtail possum (Petropseudes dahli)
 Genus Pseudocheirus
 Western ringtail possum (Pseudocheirus occidentalis)
 Common ringtail possum (Pseudocheirus peregrinus)
 Genus Pseudochirulus
 Lowland ringtail possum (Pseudochirulus canescens)
 Weyland ringtail possum (Pseudochirulus caroli)
 Cinereus ringtail possum (Pseudochirulus cinereus)
 Painted ringtail possum (Pseudochirulus forbesi)
 Herbert River ringtail possum (Pseudochirulus herbertensis)
 Masked ringtail possum (Pseudochirulus larvatus)
 Pygmy ringtail possum (Pseudochirulus mayeri)
 Vogelkop ringtail possum (Pseudochirulus schlegeli)
 Subfamily Pseudochiropsinae
 Genus Pseudochirops
 D'Albertis' ringtail possum (Pseudochirops albertisii)
 Green ringtail possum (Pseudochirops archeri)
 Plush-coated ringtail possum (Pseudochirops corinnae)
 Reclusive ringtail possum (Pseudochirops coronatus)
 Coppery ringtail possum (Pseudochirops cupreus)
 Family Petauridae
 Subfamily Dactylopsilinae
 Genus Dactylopsila
 Subgenus Dactylonax
 Long-fingered triok (Dactylopsila palpator)
 Subgenus Dactylopsila
 (Dactylopsila kambuayai)
 Great-tailed triok (Dactylopsila megalura)
 Tate's triok (Dactylopsila tatei)
 Striped possum (Dactylopsila trivirgata)
 Genus Gymnobelideus
 Leadbeater's possum (Gymnobelideus leadbeateri)
 Subfamily Petaurinae
 Genus Petaurus
 Northern glider (Petaurus abidi)
 Yellow-bellied glider (Petaurus australis)
 Biak glider (Petaurus biacensis)
 Sugar glider (Petaurus breviceps)
 Mahogany glider (Petaurus gracilis)
 Squirrel glider (Petaurus norfolcensis)
 Family Tarsipedidae
 Genus Tarsipes
 Honey possum (Tarsipes rostratus)
 Family Acrobatidae
 Genus Acrobates
 Feathertail glider (Acrobates pygmaeus)
 Genus Distoechurus
 Feather-tailed possum (Distoechurus pennatus)

Suborder Macropodiformes (kangaroos, wallaroos, wallabies)
Family Macropodidae
 Subfamily Sthenurinae
 Genus Lagostrophus
 Banded hare-wallaby (Lagostrophus fasciatus)
 Subfamily Macropodinae
 Genus Dendrolagus: tree-kangaroos
 Grizzled tree-kangaroo (Dendrolagus inustus)
 Lumholtz's tree-kangaroo (Dendrolagus lumholtzi)
 Bennett's tree-kangaroo (Dendrolagus bennettianus)
 Ursine tree-kangaroo (Dendrolagus ursinus)
 Matschie's tree-kangaroo (Dendrolagus matschiei)
 Doria's tree-kangaroo (Dendrolagus dorianus)
 Goodfellow's tree-kangaroo (Dendrolagus goodfellowi)
 Lowlands tree-kangaroo (Dendrolagus spadix)
 Golden-mantled tree-kangaroo (Dendrolagus pulcherrimus)
 Seri's tree-kangaroo (Dendrolagus stellarum)
 Dingiso (Dendrolagus mbaiso)
 Tenkile (Dendrolagus scottae)
 Genus Dorcopsis
 Brown dorcopsis (Dorcopsis muelleri)
 White-striped dorcopsis (Dorcopsis hageni)
 Black dorcopsis (Dorcopsis atrata)
 Gray dorcopsis (Dorcopsis luctuosa)
 Genus Dorcopsulus
 Small dorcopsis (Dorcopsulus vanheurni)
 Macleay's dorcopsis (Dorcopsulus macleayi)
 Genus Lagorchestes
 †Lake Mackay hare-wallaby (Lagorchestes asomatus)
 Spectacled hare-wallaby (Lagorchestes conspicillatus)
 Rufous hare-wallaby (Lagorchestes hirsutus)
 †Eastern hare-wallaby (Lagorchestes leporides)
 Genus Macropus: kangaroos and wallabies
 Subgenus Notamacropus
 Agile wallaby (Macropus agilis)
 Black-striped wallaby (Macropus dorsalis)
 Tammar wallaby (Macropus eugenii)
 †Toolache wallaby (Macropus greyii)
 Western brush wallaby (Macropus irma)
 Parma wallaby: (Macropus parma) (rediscovered, thought extinct for 100 years)
 Whiptail wallaby: (Macropus parryi)
 Red-necked wallaby: (Macropus rufogriseus)
 Subgenus Osphranter
 Antilopine kangaroo (Macropus antilopinus)
 Woodward's wallaroo (Macropus bernardus)
 Eastern wallaroo (Macropus robustus)
 Red kangaroo (Macropus rufus)
 Subgenus Macropus
 Western grey kangaroo (Macropus fuliginosus)
 Eastern grey kangaroo (Macropus giganteus)
 Genus Onychogalea
 Bridled nail-tail wallaby (Onychogalea fraenata)
 †Crescent nail-tail wallaby (Onychogalea lunata)
 Northern nail-tail wallaby (Onychogalea unguifera)
 Genus Petrogale
 P. brachyotis species-group
 Short-eared rock-wallaby (Petrogale brachyotis)
 Monjon (Petrogale burbidgei)
 Nabarlek (Petrogale concinna)
 P. xanthopus species-group
 Proserpine rock-wallaby (Petrogale persephone)
 Rothschild's rock-wallaby (Petrogale rothschildi)
 Yellow-footed rock-wallaby (Petrogale xanthopus)
 P. lateralis/penicillata species-group
 Allied rock-wallaby (Petrogale assimilis)
 Cape York rock-wallaby (Petrogale coenensis)
 Godman's rock-wallaby (Petrogale godmani)
 Herbert's rock-wallaby (Petrogale herberti)
 Unadorned rock-wallaby (Petrogale inornata)
 Black-flanked rock-wallaby (Petrogale lateralis)
 Mareeba rock-wallaby (Petrogale mareeba)
 Brush-tailed rock-wallaby (Petrogale penicillata)
 Purple-necked rock-wallaby (Petrogale purpureicollis)
 Mount Claro rock-wallaby (Petrogale sharmani)
 Genus Setonix
 Quokka (Setonix brachyurus)
 Genus Thylogale
 Tasmanian pademelon (Thylogale billardierii)
 Brown's pademelon (Thylogale browni)
 Dusky pademelon (Thylogale brunii)
 Calaby's pademelon (Thylogale calabyi)
 Mountain pademelon (Thylogale lanatus)
 Red-legged pademelon (Thylogale stigmatica)
 Red-necked pademelon (Thylogale thetis)
 Genus Wallabia
 Swamp wallaby or black wallaby (Wallabia bicolor)
 Family Potoroidae
 Genus Aepyprymnus
 Rufous rat-kangaroo (Aepyprymnus rufescens)
 Genus Bettongia
 Eastern bettong (Bettongia gaimardi)
 Boodie (Bettongia lesueur)
 Woylie (Bettongia penicillata)
 Northern bettong (Bettongia tropica)
 Genus Caloprymnus
 †Desert rat-kangaroo (Caloprymnus campestris)
 Genus Potorous
 Gilbert's potoroo (Potorous gilbertii)
 Long-footed potoroo (Potorous longipes)
 †Broad-faced potoroo (Potorous platyops)
 Long-nosed potoroo (Potorous tridactylus)
 Family Hypsiprymnodontidae
 Genus Hypsiprymnodon
 Musky rat-kangaroo (Hypsiprymnodon moschatus)

See also
List of marsupials of Western Australia
Mammal classification
List of prehistoric mammals
List of recently extinct mammals
List of placental mammals

References

List
List
Monotremes and marsupials
Taxonomic lists